Lorraine Bowen (born 31 October 1961 in Cheltenham, Gloucestershire) is an English singer, songwriter, comedian and musician. Bowen has released seven studio and compilation albums, and multiple singles as both a solo and contributing artist.

Music career

Early career
She studied music at the University of Surrey, and then busked around London. She was a member of two bands in the 1980s: See You in Vegas and The Dinner Ladies, as well as performing regularly with Billy Bragg on stage and on record. She has also made many appearances on BBC Radio 4 including John Shuttleworth's show Radio Shuttleworth and the 1999 all-female sketch show Heated Rollers, starring Lynda Bellingham, Gwyneth Strong and Joanna Monro. She has also written for BBC Radio 4's Loose Ends.

1990–present: Solo career
In 1990, Billy Bragg encouraged Bowen to start a solo career. She started to perform solo shows under name of The Lorraine Bowen Experience; her act featured three songs, a Casio keyboard and an ironing board. This has led to shows all over the world, including festivals in Winnipeg, Toronto, San Francisco, and in the UK, Glastonbury, Edinburgh, Glasgay, Bestival, The Big Chill, Secret Garden Party and Shambala and many shows in Italy and Spain.
Her songs are seen as "quirky", contain humour and are often with a sense of kitsch.   Themes often include food, film stars (one of her most popular songs is about Julie Christie), mobile phones, fish fingers and launderettes. Bowen is known for her catchy choruses in songs and encouraging audience participation.

2005–2009: Vital Organs
Vital Organs was the name of Bowen's first solo musical comedy tour celebrating her collection of portable Casio electronic organs, omnichord and other eccentric portable organs. First performed at London's Drill Hall, the show toured extensively between 2005 and 2009.

2011–2014: Lorraine Bowen meets Barbara Moore
In 2011, Bowen discovered that composer Barbara Moore was alive and living in Bognor Regis while recording an episode of Lorraine Bowen's Stereo Spectacular radio programme. Moore was active in the British music scene for over 25 years. After starting as a member of The Ladybirds, went on to work with Elton John, Jimi Hendrix and Tom Jones amongst others, but she is not widely known today. Bowen created 'Lorraine Bowen meets Barbara Moore' to provide a platform to show others how prolific Moore had been in the 1960s and 1970s. This show presented Moore and her work to a new audience and featured in the Brighton Fringe festival in 2014.

2011–2015: Lorraine Bowen's Comfort Zone and Lorraine Bowen's Polyester Fiesta!
Lorraine Bowen Comfort Zone show was a 'durational project' of three connected concerts exploring hibernation in connection with Brighton's Pink Fringe and the Nightingale Theatre.  Supported by Arts Council of Great Britain, the show ran through the winters of 2011 and 2012, drawing upon a series of experiences provided by Charlotte Glasson, Mick Jackson and others.

Lorraine Bowen's Polyester Fiesta show celebrates polyester and has four models, a scientist and a wardrobe mistress. Bowen acts as hostess, model and sings down the catwalk. Bowen has been a collector of vintage polyester outfits since visiting jumble sales as a girl and the collection has been featured on BBC One's The One Show and BBC Radio 4's Woman's Hour.

Polyester Fiesta! toured during 2015, been performed at Glasgay, The South Bank Vintage Festival, Brighton Fringe, Colchester Arts Centre  and Royal Vauxhall Tavern among others.

2015: Britain's Got Talent 
Bowen was a contestant on Britain's Got Talent in May 2015 and was sent through to the live semi-finals by David Walliams' golden buzzer after she sang her own song "The Crumble Song." Simon Cowell, Amanda Holden, and Alesha Dixon all buzzed the act, which was about her love of apple crumble. Bowen was voted off the show in the first semi-final after singing a song about space. She came fourth in the votes, which was not enough to get into the final.

2019: Much Ado About Bingo
This show is a musical cabaret, which features Bowen along with Derek Daniels Boogaloo Stu and the musical accompaniment of Ronnie Hazelnut Jason Peg on piano. Offering a mash-up of a Shakespearean game of musical bingo, classic 1970s tunes and largely fictional showbiz anecdotes.

Game music

2020
Bowen started work writing music with Philipp Stollenmayer for his KAMIBOX mobile Game company during the lockdown in 2020. The first release by the company is due in 2023.

2021
She also wrote the theme tune to Kitty Q/Katze Q - in English and German - a game introducing 12-14 year olds to the world of Quantum Physics.

Teaching career

During her early career, Bowen also worked as a part-time music teacher in schools across Hackney.  Now based in Brighton, Bowen runs singing workshops at the Brighton Dome and Bexhill's De La Warr Pavilion.

Media career

Radio
Lorraine Bowen's Stereo Spectacular is Bowen's radio show consisting of binaural field recordings, interviews and eclectic tracks. Award-winning and featured on Brighton's Radio Reverb, the shows are now available as a podcast.

Film
Bowen provided the soundtrack for No Deposit, No Return by Dallas Campbell. Her original song "Julie Christie" appeared on the Canadian independent film, Better Than Chocolate soundtrack. Bowen also provides vocals on "There Must Be An Angel" in Sorrentino's 2013 film, The Great Beauty.

In 2022, Bowen's song 'Take Time', which first appeared on ‘Suburban Exotica’ was featured in the soundtrack for the film  ‘Father Earth’ (2022).

Writing
Bowen is the author of The Crumble Lady, a collection of short stories for children published by Candy Jar Books in November 2017.

Work with other artists
She was discovered by Billy Bragg at the Hackney Empire performing with The Dinner Ladies. After a successful audition to fill in for Cara Tivey's maternity leave, Bowen found herself performing her first show with Bragg at the Liverpool Opera House as part of the Workers Playtime Tour. She then toured East Germany just before reunification, performing in Army camps and stadia. Bowen made an appearance in two episodes of Radio Shuttleworth with John Shuttleworth (S01, E02 and S02, E03).

Discography

Albums
 Greatest Hits Volume One (1995)
 Greatest Hits Volume Two (1998)
 Bossy Nova (2000)
 Songs from the Living Room (2002, Italian)
 Vital Organs (2006)
 Suburban Exotica (2010)
 The Crumble Lady (2016)
 Down to Earth (EP) (2021)
 Beauty at the Computer (2022)

Singles
 "Faffing Around on Facebook" (2012)
 "Drinking Song" (in German) (2012)
 "Valentine's Day (in a 21st Century Way)" (2013)
 "Japanese Crumble Song (Sushi Song)" (2013)
 "Bears" (2015)
 "Give My Love to Hull" (2015)
 "Christmas Crumble" (2015)
 "Crumble de Noel" (2015)
 "Reggaeton Crumble Song" (2016)
 "Kitty Q Game Theme" (2021)
 "Katze Q game Theme" (2021
 "Hibernate With Me" – studio version (2021)
 "Shit Happens" (2021)
 "War is Over, Bang the Drums" (2022)
 "Apfelkuchen Song" with Philipp Stollenmayer (2022)
 "Ecstasy is Having Your Ears Syringed" (2022)
 "Backup Song"' (2022)

As a contributing artist
Billy Bragg
 The Internationale (1990)
 Don't Try This at Home (1991)

Dope Smugglaz
 "The Word" (1998)

Fantastic Plastic Machine
 "There Must Be An Angel (Playing with My Heart) (Mix for Mirror Ball)" (1998)
 "Bossa For Jackie (Dedicated to Mrs Kennedy)" (1998)

The Damned
 So, Who's Paranoid? (2008)

References

External links
 Lorraine Bowen's official website
 

1961 births
Living people
English women singer-songwriters
English keyboardists
People from Cheltenham
Alumni of the University of Surrey
Musicians from Gloucestershire
Britain's Got Talent contestants